Speed Challenge: Jacques Villeneuve's Racing Vision is a racing video game published in 2002 by Ubisoft in Europe and Canada. It was released for PlayStation 2, GameCube, and Microsoft Windows.

Gameplay
Players are able to race in different tracks using futuristic racing cars shaped like Formula One cars.

External links

2002 video games
PlayStation 2 games
GameCube games
Racing video games
Ubisoft games
Video games developed in France
Windows games